Andreas Garyfallos (1931 – 17 February 2015) was a Greek water polo player, one of the greatest in the history of Greek water polo as he is considered the "Patriarch of Greek water polo".  He competed in the men's tournament at the 1968 Summer Olympics as a player-coach. 

He won 17 Greek Championships during the 1947 to 1968 span (all of them without defeat except for 1964 and 1968) and 6 consecutive Greek Cups (1953-1958) with Ethnikos Piraeus. 

He was later head coach of Kerkyra NC, Aris Thessaloniki, Panathinaikos, Ethnikos, NC Chios, Iraklis Thessaloniki. 

He also held the position of Ethnikos's president. 

The swimming pool in the Votsalakia beach in Piraeus bears his name.

Honours 
17 Greek Championships

 1948, 1953, 1954, 1955, 1956, 1957, 1958, 1959, 1960, 1961, 1962, 1963, 1964, 1965, 1966, 1967, 1968

6 Greek Cups

 1953, 1954, 1955, 1956, 1957, 1958

References

External links
 

1931 births
2015 deaths
Greek male water polo players
Olympic water polo players of Greece
Panathinaikos Water Polo Club coaches
Water polo players at the 1968 Summer Olympics
Water polo players from Piraeus
Ethnikos Piraeus Water Polo Club players